Armstrong is a city in the southwest of the province of Santa Fe, Argentina.

The economy of the area is based on agriculture, but Armstrong, together with nearby Las Parejas, have also become industrial centers focused on the manufacturing of agricultural machinery for local use and export. These two cities together are home to 20% of Argentina's productive establishment of said industry.

Armstrong hosts an annual agro-industrial fair, Feriagro, which gathers exhibitors and visitors from the whole country and abroad. The agro-machinery industry has boomed since the turn of the 21st century, as the Argentine economy recovers.

History
The area of the present-day town was under the jurisdiction of the Society of Jesus in colonial times. It passed to Spanish landowners, then to British ones, and then to the Central Argentine Railway company (CAR). Armstrong was started as a colony around a newly installed train station in 1882. At the time the area was occupied by a majority of Italian immigrants. The name of the settlement was an homage to Tomás Armstrong, a pioneer in the development of the CAR.

The colony officially became a comuna (a small town commune) in 1886, and a full municipality on 16 November 1984.

Twin Cities
 Osimo, Marche, Italy

References
 municipalidad de Armstrong
 
 
  Feriagro - Institutional website.
 Delfo Cabrera - Armstrong.

Populated places in Santa Fe Province